The town of Tingzhou is the seat of the Changting County, Longyan government, Party and police.

History
For information on Tingzhou Town's colorful past, see the wiki pages on the county it seats and on the former prefecture it seated. In early April 1932, Mao Zedong, Zhou Enlai and others held a military conference to attack Zhangzhou at the Church of Christ in China.

Reference of Place-name
The county town bears the name of the large pre-Republican prefecture which it long administered; Tingzhou fu encompassed Ninghua and Qingliu counties in Sanming municipality as well as the entirety of Longyan.

Religion
The town is the seat of a modest cathedral built by Roman Catholic bishop Johann Lesinski. To this day the territory of the Imperial-era prefecture Tingzhou fu remains, in the eyes of the Holy See, a diocese under the Metropolitan at Fuzhou. The cathedral has no such status though under the Patriotic Catholic administration, and in fact is little used even as a church.

Notes and references

Cities in Fujian
Longyan
Township-level divisions of Fujian